Iran competed at the 2018 Winter Olympics in Pyeongchang, South Korea, from 9 to 25 February 2018, with four competitors in two sports.

Competitors
The following is the list of number of competitors participating in the Iranian delegation per sport.

Alpine skiing 

Iran qualified two athletes, one male and one female.

Cross-country skiing 

Iran qualified two athletes, one male and one female.

Distance

Sprint

See also
Iran at the 2017 Asian Winter Games
Iran at the 2018 Summer Youth Olympics

References

Nations at the 2018 Winter Olympics
2018
2018 in Iranian sport